Miguel Armando Aguilar (born September 26, 1991) is a Mexican professional baseball pitcher who is currently a free agent. He made his Major League Baseball (MLB) debut in 2021.

Career

Algodoneros de Unión Laguna
Aguilar began his career in the Mexican League with the Algodoneros de Unión Laguna in 2012, going 0–0 with a 5.87 ERA in 115.1 innings. In 2013 with the team, Aguilar went 4–4 with a 5.68 ERA in 38 innings.

Leones de Yucatán
On July 8, 2014, Aguilar was traded to the Leones de Yucatán. Between the two teams, he went 0–0 with a 10.66 ERA over 21.1 innings in 2014. Aguilar went 1–1 with a 2.14 ERA in 33.1 innings in 2015, and went 1–1 with a 2.08 ERA in 30.1 innings for Yucatán in 2016.

Arizona Diamondbacks
On September 19, 2016, Aguilar signed a minor league contract with the Arizona Diamondbacks organization. He spent the 2017 season with the High-A Visalia Rawhide, going 0–0 with a 1.19 ERA in 22.2 innings. He split the 2018 season between Visalia and the Double-A Jackson Generals, going a combined 1–2 with a 2.97 ERA over 57.2 innings. He spent the 2019 season with Jackson, going 1–1 with a 2.12 ERA in 29.2 innings. Following the 2019 season, Aguilar played for the Salt River Rafters of the Arizona Fall League. Aguilar did not play in a game in 2020 due to the cancellation of the minor league season because of the COVID-19 pandemic. He was assigned to the Triple-A Reno Aces to begin the 2021 season. On July 30, 2021, Arizona selected his contract and promoted him to the active roster.  He made his debut that day against the Los Angeles Dodgers. Three days later, on August 2, García was charged with the loss in his first career decision when he pitched the tenth inning against the San Francisco Giants, giving up two earned runs. On August 17, Aguilar earned his first career win against the Philadelphia Phillies. In nine MLB appearances, Aguilar pitched to a 1–1 record with a 6.43 ERA in 7.0 innings. 

On November 19th, the Arizona Diamondbacks sent Aguilar outright to Reno Aces. He was released on November 15, 2022.

International baseball
Aguilar was selected for the Mexico national baseball team at the 2017 World Baseball Classic.

References

External links

1991 births
Living people
Sportspeople from Nayarit
Mexican expatriate baseball players in the United States
Major League Baseball pitchers
Major League Baseball players from Mexico
Arizona Diamondbacks players
Algodoneros de Unión Laguna players
Venados de Mazatlán players
Leones de Yucatán players
Yaquis de Obregón players
Visalia Rawhide players
Jackson Generals (Southern League) players
Salt River Rafters players
Reno Aces players
2017 World Baseball Classic players